The Syracuse Northern Electric Railway, also known as the Syracuse and Northern Electric Railway, was an interurban rail that ran from Syracuse, New York, to Oswego, New York, a distance of . The line also proceeded to South Bay, New York, on Oneida Lake.

The rail was formerly the Syracuse and South Bay Railway Company and the name was changed in 1917.

References

Defunct railroads in Syracuse, New York
Defunct New York (state) railroads
Railway companies established in 1917
Railway companies disestablished in 1931
Interurban railways in New York (state)